Newton-le-Willows railway station is a railway station in the town of Newton-le-Willows, in the Metropolitan Borough of St Helens, and at the edge of the Merseytravel region ( from Liverpool Lime Street).  The station is branded Merseyrail. The station is situated on the northern route of the Liverpool to Manchester Line, the former Liverpool and Manchester Railway which opened in 1830. It is a busy feeder station for nearby towns which no longer have railway stations, such as Golborne, Billinge and Haydock.  There is also a complimentary bus shuttle service to Haydock Park Racecourse on certain racedays.

History
The station was built in 1845 and opened by the London and North Western Railway, originally named Newton Bridge. It was renamed  Newton-le-Willows on 14 June 1888.

The station avoided the Beeching Axe in the 1960s, though the Warrington to Wigan local trains along the WCML ended in 1969 along with services via Leigh. The Motorail terminal closed in the early 1980s as British Rail cut back the number of routes on offer across the network, though the sidings into it were not finally removed until August 2013.

Redevelopment
Merseytravel put forward proposals in December 2015 for the station to be developed as an interchange station. The proposals were later approved with the work scheduled to be completed by March 2018.

Work on the new facilities started on 28 November 2016 and included:

New South side entrance
New ticket office at south entrance 
Bus Interchange adjacent to the new ticket office
400+ space car park (including blue badge and wider spaces)
Electric vehicle charging points
New toilet facilities
Improved passenger waiting facilities
Step free access to and between the platforms via a new subway and lifts
Increased cycle parking
Dedicated drop off and pick up area
Local highways improvements
Following some delays, the work was completed and the redeveloped station officially opened on Sunday 13 January 2019.

Electrification
The line through the station was electrified by British Rail in 1973 as part of the West Coast Main Line electrification scheme, and the station was served by electrically hauled mail trains, but no regularly scheduled electric passenger trains called here. This finally changed over forty years later when the Liverpool to Manchester line via Chat Moss was electrified by Network Rail as part of the North West Electrification Programme. Commuter services which call at Newton-le-Willows have been operated by four car Class 319 electric multiple units since March 2015, with 3-car Class 323 units also now appearing on many services and the occasional Class 331.

Facilities
Like most Merseytravel stations, it is staffed from start of service until the last train has left (closing just before midnight each evening).  There are also self-service ticket machines provided. There are shelters on both platforms, along with digital information screens and timetable poster boards. On the south side of the station there is also a bus interchange with buses to a few local destinations and a large free car park.

Services
The May 2018 timetable change has seen a major upgrade of services here. At peak times there is also a limited local service to Manchester Victoria and a single evening train to  via the Parkside West curve (a balancing service from there runs in the morning).

On Sundays the service frequency remains the same on all routes, though TfW trains only run to and from Chester. East Midlands Railway services between Liverpool and Nottingham/Norwich services sometimes call here if their usual route via  is closed for engineering work, with Warrington-bound passengers changing here for a rail-replacement bus connection.

The new "Northern Connect" services from Chester to Leeds via Manchester Victoria and Bradford Interchange also stops at Newton-le-Willows following its introduction in May 2019. This runs hourly each way Mondays to Saturdays, with two trains running to/from  rather than Chester at weekday peak times.

Northern rail opened up a consultation on proposed services which would operate through Newton-le-Willows from December 2022  which reduces the volume of services to and from Manchester Piccadilly, and increased service to Manchester Victoria.

See also
Listed buildings in St Helens, Merseyside

References

External links

Railway stations in St Helens, Merseyside
DfT Category E stations
Former London and North Western Railway stations
Railway stations in Great Britain opened in 1845
Northern franchise railway stations
Railway stations served by Transport for Wales Rail
1861 establishments in England
Newton-le-Willows
Railway stations served by TransPennine Express